Bénévent-et-Charbillac (Vivaro-Alpine: Benevent e Charbilhac) is a former commune in the Hautes-Alpes department in southeastern France. Since 2013, it is part of the commune Saint-Bonnet-en-Champsaur.

Population

See also
Communes of the Hautes-Alpes department

References

Former communes of Hautes-Alpes
Populated places disestablished in 2013